St. John's Episcopal Church is a historic Episcopal church located at 315 S. Main Street in Marion, McDowell County, North Carolina. It was built in 1883, and is a one-story, Carpenter Gothic style frame church.  It has a steeply pitched gable roof, board and batten exterior walls, lancet windows, and an elaborate bell tower added in 1903. St. John's is one of the few buildings that survived the 1894 fire on Main Street. St. John's Episcopal Church is a vibrant spiritual Community with roots formed more than a Century ago.

The St. John's Episcopal Church, Marion, NC dates back to May 24, 1881, with the first two years of St. John's, services were held in private homes and other church buildings. Since 1883 the church has congregated at the same location on South Main Street.

It was added to the National Register of Historic Places in 1991. It is located in the Main Street Historic District.

References

Churches completed in 1883
19th-century Episcopal church buildings
Episcopal church buildings in North Carolina
Churches in Marion, North Carolina
Churches on the National Register of Historic Places in North Carolina
National Register of Historic Places in McDowell County, North Carolina
Historic district contributing properties in North Carolina